XHGDA-FM is a radio station in Guadalajara. Located on 89.1 FM, XHGDA-FM is owned by Audiorama, a related company to Radiorama and carries its La Bestia Grupera grupera format.

History
Víctor Manuel Moreno Torres received the concession for XHGDA-FM on September 10, 1990. In 2005, the station was sold to Medios de Información de Occidente, a concessionaire owned in part by Carlos Quiñones, founder of Radio S.A. Under his management, Radio S.A. operated XHGDA with its Máxima pop format.

In 2011, the station was leased to Grupo Multimedios, which placed its Milenio Radio format on the station. XHGDA was the first radio station in Guadalajara for Multimedios. In 2017, XHGDA returned to Audiorama operation with La Bestia Grupera, and Milenio Radio Jalisco became online-only. The station was also relocated to a new Radiorama transmission facility in San Miguel in the municipality of Zapopan.

References

Radio stations in Guadalajara
Radio stations established in 1990